Carlos Manuel Rovirosa Ramírez (born 19 May 1953) is a Mexican politician affiliated with the Institutional Revolutionary Party. As of 2014, he served as Deputy of the LIX Legislature of the Mexican Congress representing Tabasco.

References

1953 births
Living people
Politicians from Tabasco
Institutional Revolutionary Party politicians
People from Macuspana
Universidad Juárez Autónoma de Tabasco alumni
Members of the Congress of Tabasco
21st-century Mexican politicians
Deputies of the LIX Legislature of Mexico
Members of the Chamber of Deputies (Mexico) for Tabasco